Xavier Gravelaine (born 5 October 1968) is a French football manager and former football player, who played for many clubs in France and Europe and for the France national team.

He was sometimes seen as a mercenary because of the impressive number of teams he played for but often appreciated by supporters. In his spell in England, for Watford, he is remembered by the fans for scoring a brace in a 3–2 win over Southampton in December 1999.

After his retirement, he became a coach at FC Istres, but did not manage to save the team from relegation. He was a consultant on France Télévisions from 2004 to 2012, on Eurosport in 2013–2014. In 2014, he was appointed Deputy Director of Stade Malherbe Caen.

References

External links
 http://www.fff.fr/servfff/historique/historique.php?cherche_joueur=GRAVELAINE&submit=go
 http://racingstub.com/page.php?page=joueur&id=146

1968 births
Living people
Sportspeople from Tours, France
Association football midfielders
Association football forwards
French footballers
French expatriate footballers
France international footballers
FC Nantes players
FC Libourne players
Stade Lavallois players
Stade Malherbe Caen players
Paris Saint-Germain F.C. players
RC Strasbourg Alsace players
En Avant Guingamp players
Olympique de Marseille players
Montpellier HSC players
Watford F.C. players
Le Havre AC players
AS Monaco FC players
AC Ajaccio players
FC Istres players
FC Sion players
Premier League players
Ligue 1 players
Ligue 2 players
Expatriate footballers in England
Expatriate footballers in Switzerland
French football managers
FC Istres managers
Footballers from Centre-Val de Loire